Kukuyevka is a common name shared by a number of rural localities in Russia.

Belgorod Oblast 
 Kukuyevka, a selo in Valuysky District

Bryansk Oblast 
 Kukuyevka, Bryansk Oblast, a settlement

Kursk Oblast 
 Kukuyevka, Kursky District, Kursk Oblast, a village
 Kukuyevka (village), Fatezhsky District, Kursk Oblast, a village
 Kukuyevka (khutor), Fatezhsky District, Kursk Oblast, a khutor
 Kukuyevka, Shchigrovsky District, Kursk Oblast, a village

Oryol Oblast 
 Kukuyevka, Glazynovsky District, Oryol Oblast, a village
 Kukuyevka, Khotynetsky District, Oryol Oblast, a village
 Kukuyevka, Soskovsky District, Oryol Oblast, a settlement

Pskov Oblast 
 Kukuyevka, Pskov Oblast, a village

Smolensk Oblast 
 Kukuyevka, Smolensk Oblast, a village

Tula Oblast 
 Kukuyevka, Chernsky District, Tula Oblast, a village
 Kukuyevka, Kurkinsky District, Tula Oblast, a village
 Kukuyevka, Shchyokinsky District, Tula Oblast, a village

Sources